The 1927 All-Ireland Junior Hurling Championship was the 10th staging of the All-Ireland Junior Championship since its establishment by the Gaelic Athletic Association in 1912.

Tipperary entered the championship as the defending champions, however, they were beaten by Limerick in the Munster first round.

The All-Ireland final was played on 1 July 1928 at Dundalk Sportsfield, between Meath and Britain, in what was their first ever meeting in a final. Meath won the match by 2-03 to 1-01 to claim their first ever championship title.

Results

All-Ireland Junior Hurling Championship

All-Ireland semi-finals

All-Ireland home final

All-Ireland final

References

Junior
All-Ireland Junior Hurling Championship